Silver Springs is a census-designated place (CDP) in Lyon County, Nevada, United States at the intersection of US 50 (California Trail) and US 95A. The population was 5,296 at the 2010 census. Lahontan Reservoir, Lahontan State Recreation Area and historic Fort Churchill State Historic Park are all located nearby. The area is served by the Silver Springs Airport.

Geography
U.S. Route 50 leads east  to Fallon and west  to Carson City, the state capital. U.S. Route 95A leads north  to Interstate 80 at Fernley and south  to Yerington, the county seat.

The Carson River forms the southern and eastern edges of the CDP; on the east side it is impounded to form Lahontan Reservoir. Lahontan State Recreation Area, on the shores of the reservoir, is within the CDP.

Demographics

As of the census of 2000, there were 4,708 people, 1,766 households, and 1,227 families residing in the CDP. The population density was 65.0 people per square mile (25.1/km2). There were 1,935 housing units at an average density of 26.7 per square mile (10.3/km2). The racial makeup of the CDP was 91.67% White, 1.21% African American, 1.83% Native American, 0.45% Asian, 0.21% Pacific Islander, 1.47% from other races, and 3.16% from two or more races. Hispanic or Latino of any race were 4.63% of the population.

There were 1,766 households, out of which 28.7% had children under the age of 18 living with them, 55.3% were married couples living together, 8.9% had a female householder with no husband present, and 30.5% were non-families. 22.7% of all households were made up of individuals, and 9.5% had someone living alone who was 65 years of age or older. The average household size was 2.59 and the average family size was 3.02.

In the CDP, the population was spread out, with 25.0% under the age of 18, 5.5% from 18 to 24, 27.8% from 25 to 44, 27.4% from 45 to 64, and 14.1% who were 65 years of age or older. The median age was 40 years. For every 100 females, there were 96.7 males. For every 100 females age 18 and over, there were 95.5 males.

The median income for a household in the CDP was $34,427, and the median income for a family was $42,125. Males had a median income of $34,712 versus $23,750 for females. The per capita income for the CDP was $16,576. About 10.8% of families and 14.9% of the population were below the poverty line, including 21.9% of those under age 18 and 10.3% of those age 65 or over.

See also
Ben Klassen, white supremacist and co-founder of the town in the mid-20th century

References

Census-designated places in Lyon County, Nevada
Census-designated places in Nevada